Mitch Lamoureux (born August 22, 1962) is a Canadian former professional ice hockey player.

Lamoureux was born in Ottawa, Ontario, but grew up in Nepean, Ontario. He played in the NHL with the Pittsburgh Penguins and Philadelphia Flyers. He was inducted into the AHL Hall of Fame in the class of 2011.

He is currently employed by PA Central Credit Union as Director of Business Development.

Career statistics

References

External links
 

1962 births
Living people
Baltimore Skipjacks players
B.C. Icemen players
Canadian ice hockey centres
Hershey Bears players
Maine Mariners players
Oshawa Generals players
Philadelphia Flyers players
Pittsburgh Penguins draft picks
Pittsburgh Penguins players
Providence Bruins players
San Diego Gulls (IHL) players
SC Lyss players
Ice hockey people from Ottawa